Hydaticus ricinus, is a species of predaceous diving beetle found in India, Afghanistan, Bhutan, Myanmar, Nepal, Pakistan, Sri Lanka, China, Laos, Thailand, and Vietnam.

Description
Male is about 9.5 mm long. Suture between the metepisternum and metasternal wings is straight. Apical spurs of the hind tibiae are simple, and pointed. Scutellum is visible.

References 

Dytiscidae
Insects of Sri Lanka
Insects described in 1979